Killington Village is a census-designated place (CDP) in the town of Killington, Rutland County, Vermont, United States, comprising residential development associated with Killington Ski Resort. As of the 2020 census, Killington Village had a population of 861, out of 1,407 people in the entire town.

The CDP is in eastern Rutland County, within the Green Mountains, along both sides of Killington Road, which runs south  from U.S. Route 4 to the Killington ski area. Route 4 runs through the northern part of the CDP from Sherburne Pass in the west to the valley of the Ottauquechee River in the east, then turns south at Sherburne Center and forms the eastern border of the CDP. North of Route 4, the CDP extends to Kent Pond and includes part of Gifford Woods State Park. The Appalachian Trail crosses the northern part of the CDP.

References 

Populated places in Rutland County, Vermont
Census-designated places in Rutland County, Vermont
Census-designated places in Vermont